Michael "Mike" Laurence Vejar (born June 25, 1943, in Los Angeles, California) is an American television director, with directing credits on four Star Trek series, as well as directing other notable series, such as Zorro, Babylon 5, MacGyver, The Dead Zone, The X-Files and Jeremiah.  He directed the episode "Ultra Woman" in Lois and Clark: The New Adventures of Superman.

Notes 
In Babylon 5 episode "The Geometry of Shadows" he is credited as director, 'Mike Laurence Vejar'.

References

External links 
 

1943 births
Living people
American television directors
People from Los Angeles